Zilola Bahodirovna Musaeva (born 28 July 1979), most commonly known by her stage name Shahzoda, is an Uzbek singer and actress. Shahzoda has become a highly popular singer in Uzbekistan and other neighboring countries.

In the early 2010s, Shahzoda gained some fame in Russia. She has recorded songs in Uzbek, Russian, Persian, Kazakh, Tajik, and English.

Personal life
Zilola Musaeva was born on 28 July 1979, in Fergana. She is married to Ravshanbek Yuldashev and she has two children.

Music career 
Before her solo career, Shahzoda was one of two members of the pop band "Jonim". They came to fame with their song "Qarama koʻzlarimga" ("Don't Look at My Eyes") in 1998. The band separated two years later and both Shahzoda and Aziza launched successful solo careers.

Shahzoda's first single "Bor ekan" became a hit in Uzbekistan and she gained fame in pop culture. Following the success of "Bor ekan" Shahzoda released her first album with the same title in 2002. The album became one of the best selling albums of the year.

Shahzoda's second album Baxt boʻladi was released in 2003 and became another hit album for her. Shahzoda's third album Keragimsan was released in 2004 and sold more than 25,000 copies in its first week. Album's first single "Keragimsan" was released in May 2004 on Vodiy Sadosi radio. It became a hit in Uzbekistan. Singles such as "Baxtliman", "Sevgi", "Tamannozi" became hits on radio and TV channels. "Qayt", which is a duet with the well-known Uzbek rapper Shohruh, also became a hit and received positive views from critics. Album's single "Hayot ayt" was chosen as a soundtrack to the Uzbek movie Fotima va Zuhra in which Shahzoda played the lead role.

Shahzoda's fourth album Baxtliman, which was released in 2005, sold more than 50,000 copies in its first week. The album's first single "Keragimsan" was released on radio channels and was received well by fans. Singles such as "Baxtliman", "Faqat sen", "Layli va Majnun" also became hits.

Shahzoda has sung a few songs in the Tajik language, such "Manu tanho" and "Naghz mebinam", and they have been received well by Tajik fans. Her song with Shahriyor, another well-known rapper, "Birinchi sevgi" did well in charts on Uzbek TV channels.

Shahzoda has gained some fame in Russia. Her first single "1000 i Odna Noch (Russian: 1000 и одна ночи)" and "Mezhdu Nebom I Zemley" (Feat. Dj Smash) were received well by Russian fans. The video of the song has been played by many Russian Music Channels, including RU-TV.

Shahzoda's studio album entitled Qora koʻzlaring was entirely written and produced by the band Benom (Nameless).

In December 2011 Shahzoda was recognized as "The Best Artist in Central Asia and Caucasus" at Big Apple Music Awards held in New York City.

In 2012, Shahzoda started releasing songs in English, such as "Afghana", "All Alone feat Akcent", and "Flying Tonight." "Flying Tonight", which was produced by DJ Sean Bay, was uploaded to YouTube on 12 January 2012.

While it was initially revealed on 12 November 2013 that Shahzoda would represent  at the Turkvision Song Contest 2013 with the song "Medlenno", she was later replaced by Nilufar Usmonova with the song "Unutgin".

Acting career 
Shahzoda has portrayed main characters in several Uzbek movies. Fotima va Zuhra, in which Shahzoda played the lead role, did well in box office and Shahzoda received positive reviews for her role. She also played the leading role in the 2007 Uzbek movie "Zumrad va Qimmat". The soundtrack for the movie "Orzular" was sung by Shahzoda herself. Shahzoda played at movie celled O Maryam, Maryam which was popular among uzbek people.

Discography

Filmography
This is a chronologically-ordered list of films in which Shahzoda has appeared.

Music videos

Awards 
Shahzoda has received many awards. Most notably "Nihol" which is an Uzbek award given to recognize excellence of professionals in the music and film industries. She has received many Tarona Records Awards, including Best Female Singer, Best Song, Best Lyrics, Best video, Best Collaboration, and Best Design.

References

External links
Official website
Shahzoda's Russian Record label
Shahzoda mp3
Shahzoda on Instagram
Shahzoda on Twitter
Shahzoda on YouTube
Shahzoda on Facebook

1979 births
Uzbeks
Living people
People from Fergana
Uzbekistani film actresses
21st-century Uzbekistani women singers
20th-century Uzbekistani actresses
21st-century Uzbekistani actresses
Folk-pop singers